Glenn Holm (born 24 September 1955) is a retired Swedish football midfielder and later coach.

Honours
IFK Göteborg
UEFA Cup: 1981–82

References

1955 births
Living people
Swedish footballers
People from Landskrona Municipality
Örebro SK players
IFK Göteborg players
Djurgårdens IF Fotboll players
Örgryte IS players
UEFA Cup winning players
Allsvenskan players
Association football midfielders
Swedish football managers
IFK Göteborg non-playing staff
Footballers from Skåne County